"Are you Happy? / A gonna" is the 65th single by the Japanese girl group Morning Musume and was released on June 13, 2018.

Members at time of single 
 9th generation: Mizuki Fukumura, Erina Ikuta
 10th generation: Haruna Iikubo, Ayumi Ishida, Masaki Sato
 11th generation: Sakura Oda
 12th generation: Haruna Ogata , Miki Nonaka, Maria Makino, Akane Haga
 13th generation: Kaede Kaga, Reina Yokoyama
 14th generation: Chisaki Morito

Background 
On April 1, 2018, the song "A gonna" was first performed in "Hello! Project 20th Anniversary!! Hello! Project Hina Fest 2018: Morning Musume '18 Premium". Then on April 21, the song "Are you Happy?" was first performed in their Spring Concert "Morning Musume Tanjou 20 Shuunen Kinen Concert Tour 2018 Haru ~We are MORNING MUSUME~" in Shizuoka. On May 5, both songs were finally announced as their 65th single. Since before that day, they were never mentioned to be their new single. 

This also became Haruna Ogata's last single since she announced her graduation back in late March. Her graduation ceremony took place at the end of their tour on June 20.

Release 
It is a double A-side single.

The single is released in five versions: 2 CD-only regular editions and 3 CD+DVD limited editions. The first press of both regular editions comes with a trading card, randomly selected from two sets of 14 (for a total of 28 trading cards). The limited edition SP includes a lottery card to win a ticket to one of special events held by the group.

Track listings

CD

Rank and sales

References

External links 
 Release at Hello! Project
 Release at Up-Front Works

2018 singles
Morning Musume songs
Zetima Records singles
Japanese-language songs
Electronic songs
Electronic dance music songs
Oricon Weekly number-one singles
Billboard Japan Hot 100 number-one singles